Michael Charles Thomas (May 5, 1948 – October 14, 2019) was an American entomologist who co-authored the book series American Beetles.

Born in Miami, Florida, Thomas graduated from the University of South Florida in 1970 with a Bachelor of Arts degree in fine arts, followed by a Master of Science degree in Entomology from the University of Florida in 1981. Thomas also received his Ph.D. from the University of Florida.

From 1986 to 1988, Thomas worked as a Taxonomic Entomologist for the West Virginia Department of Agriculture.

Beginning in 1988, Thomas worked for the Florida Department of Agriculture in Gainesville as a Taxonomic Entomologist, an Entomology Section Administrator, and a Curator of Coleoptera and Orthoptera. His research interests included the biology and systematics of Cucujidae, and the zoogeography of the beetles of Florida. He retired in 2013.

References

 Bio page at Florida State Collection of Arthropods

External links

 
Bibliography

1948 births
2019 deaths
Writers from Miami
American entomologists
Coleopterists
University of Florida College of Agricultural and Life Sciences alumni
University of South Florida alumni